The 1990 Kansas City Royals season was a season in American baseball. It involved the Royals finishing 6th in the American League West with a record of 75 wins and 86 losses.

Offseason

Kansas City maintained their reputation as one of the American League West's top contenders throughout the late 1980s.  The club posted a winning record in three of the last four seasons following their World Series championship season. The Royals finished the 1989 season with a 92–70 record (third best record in franchise history) and a second-place finish in the AL West seven games behind the season's World Series champion Oakland Athletics.  Though the team boasted a powerhouse rotation in the AL Cy Young Award winner Bret Saberhagen (set franchise record with 23 wins in 1989), two time All-Star Mark Gubicza (15 game winner in 1989) and 1989 AL Rookie of the Year runner-up Tom Gordon (won 17 games in 1989), the organization felt they were still missing a few pieces that would give the Oakland Athletics a run for their money.

The Royals were left without a high-caliber closing pitcher when Dan Quisenberry, the team's All-Star ace closer for much of the 1980s, was dropped from the club in 1988.  Mark Davis, last season's league leader in saves (44) and boasting a 1.85 earned run average with the San Diego Padres, became a free agent at the close of the 1989 season. Kansas City had their eye on the 1989  National League Cy Young winner and back-to-back All-Star (1988, 1989), and after several attempts to acquire Davis, the organization was ultimately successful in signing him to a four-year $13 million contract (the largest annual salary in baseball history at the time). Several days earlier, the Royals bulked up their rotation by inking starting pitcher Storm Davis, who was enjoying a career-high 19 game win record (3rd best in the league) with the Athletics in 1989, on a three-year $6 million contract.  With a solid pitching rotation, which was now ranked among the best in the league, the team traded away starting pitcher Charlie Leibrandt and prospect Rick Luecken to the Atlanta Braves for 1988 All-Star first baseman Gerald Perry as an added offensive threat.  The Royals filled in their fifth starting pitching slot by signing yet another free agent with veteran right-hander Richard Dotson. Kansas City concluded a milestone off-season as its biggest commitment to free agents in the club's entire history.

With the Royals pitching combined with offensive talent the likes of future Hall of Famer George Brett, Bo Jackson (1989 All-Star), Kevin Seitzer (1987 MLB hits league leader), Kurt Stillwell (1988 All-Star), Danny Tartabull and Bob Boone, preseason writers predicted Kansas City as the shoo-in for the 1990 AL West title.

Transactions
 December 5, 1989: Richard Dotson was signed as a free agent by the Royals.
 December 7, 1989: Storm Davis was signed as a free agent by the Royals.
 December 7, 1989: Willie Wilson was signed as a free agent by the Royals.
 December 11, 1989: Mark Davis was signed as a free agent by the Royals.
 December 15, 1989: Charlie Leibrandt and Rick Luecken were traded by the Royals to the Atlanta Braves in exchange for Gerald Perry and Jim LeMasters (minors).

Regular season
Despite the promising off-season moves, the team suffered critical bullpen injuries while the newly signed Davis hurlers both experienced lackluster performances throughout the season.  The Royals concluded the 1990 campaign with a 75-86 finish and second-to-last place standing in the AL West (worst franchise record since 1970).  Though the team would bounce back with winning records during the next several years, the disastrous season would symbolically come to mark the beginning of the end of Kansas City's relevance in professional baseball.

 George Brett became a three decade batting champ by winning the 1990 American League batting title.
 July 11, 1990: In a game against the Baltimore Orioles, Bo Jackson performed his famous "wall run", when he caught a ball approximately 2-3 strides away from the wall. As he caught the ball at full tilt, Jackson looked up and noticed the wall and began to run up the wall, one leg reaching higher as he ascended. He ran along the wall almost parallel to the ground, and came down with the catch, to avoid impact and the risk of injury from the fence.
 July 17, 1990: In a game against the New York Yankees, Bo Jackson would have an outstanding performance where he blasts three home runs in his first three at bats, putting up seven RBI’s, just before he exits the game with a shoulder injury.
 August 31, 1990: Ken Griffey Sr. and Ken Griffey Jr. of the Seattle Mariners made history by being the first father and son to play in a game together. This historic game was played against the Royals.

Opening Day Roster
 Bob Boone
 George Brett
 Jim Eisenreich
 Bo Jackson
 Gerald Perry
 Bret Saberhagen
 Kevin Seitzer
 Kurt Stillwell
 Danny Tartabull
 Frank White

Season standings

Record vs. opponents

Notable transactions
 March 31, 1990: José DeJesús was traded by the Royals to the Philadelphia Phillies for Steve Jeltz.
 March 31, 1990: Mark Lee was released by the Royals.
 June 21, 1990: Richard Dotson was released by the Royals.
 August 30, 1990: Pat Tabler was traded by the Royals to the New York Mets for Archie Corbin.

Roster

Player stats

Batting

Starters by position
Note: Pos = Position; G = Games played; AB = At bats; H = Hits; Avg. = Batting average; HR = Home runs; RBI = Runs batted in

Other batters
Note: G = Games pitched; AB = At bats; H = Hits; Avg. = Batting average; HR = Home runs; RBI = Runs batted in

Pitching

Starting pitchers 
Note: G = Games pitched; IP = Innings pitched; W = Wins; L = Losses; ERA = Earned run average; SO = Strikeouts

Other pitchers 
Note: G = Games pitched; IP = Innings pitched; W = Wins; L = Losses; ERA = Earned run average; SO = Strikeouts

Relief pitchers 
Note: G = Games pitched; W = Wins; L = Losses; SV = Saves; ERA = Earned run average; SO = Strikeouts

Awards and honors
 George Brett – American League Batting Champion (.329)

All-Star Game

Farm system 

LEAGUE CHAMPIONS: Omaha, Memphis

References

External links
1990 Kansas City Royals at Baseball Reference
1990 Kansas City Royals at Baseball Almanac

Kansas City Royals seasons
Kansas
Kansas City Royals